Inturi Srinivasa Rao, better known as Vasu Inturi,  is an Indian actor and writer who works in Telugu films and television. He is known for the role of Sarvam in the TV sitcom Amrutham, which won him Nandi TV Award for Best Comedian in 2007. Inturi also worked as an assistant director and director on the series and wrote some episodes. Later, he wrote and directed the TV series Gangatho Rambabu. In 2014, he co-wrote Amrutham Chandamamalo, the first Indian space comedy film, with Gangaraju Gunnam.

Filmography

Films

Television

References

External links
 

Living people
Telugu male actors
Telugu comedians
Indian television directors
Year of birth missing (living people)
Place of birth missing (living people)
Male actors in Telugu television
Indian male comedians
Male actors in Telugu cinema
21st-century Indian male actors